The 2009 Ivy League Baseball Championship Series took place at Red Rolfe Field at Biondi Park in Hanover, New Hampshire on May 2 and 3, 2009.  The series matched the regular season champions of each of the league's two divisions.  , the winner of the series, claimed the Ivy League's automatic berth in the 2009 NCAA Division I baseball tournament.  It was Dartmouth's first Championship Series victory, coming in their fifth appearance.

 defeated  in a one-game playoff to advance to the Championship Series and represent the Lou Gehrig Division.  The playoff was held on April 29 at Hoy Field in Ithaca, New York.

Results

References

Ivy League Baseball Championship Series
Tournament
Ivy League Baseball Championship Series